The 2007 Denmark Super Series is the ninth tournament of the 2007 BWF Super Series in badminton. It was held in Odense, Denmark from October 23 to October 28, 2007.

Men's singles

Seeds
 Lin Dan
 Lee Chong Wei
 Chen Yu
 Bao Chunlai
 Chen Hong
 Peter Gade
 Chen Jin
 Sony Dwi Kuncoro

Results

Women's singles

Seeds
 Zhang Ning
 Xie Xingfang
 Zhu Lin
 Wang Chen
 Lu Lan
 Pi Hongyan
 Xu Huaiwen
 Yao Jie

Results

Men's doubles

Seeds
 Markis Kido / Hendra Setiawan
 Fu Haifeng / Cai Yun
 Koo Kien Keat / Tan Boon Heong (Champion)
 Jens Eriksen / Martin Lundgaard Hansen
 Choong Tan Fook / Lee Wan Wah
 Jung Jae-sung / Lee Yong-dae
 Luluk Hadiyanto / Alvent Yulianto
 Lars Paaske / Jonas Rasmussen

Results

Women's doubles

Seeds
 Zhang Yawen / Wei Yili
 Yang Wei / Zhang Jiewen
 Lee Kyung-won / Lee Hyo-jung
 Gao Ling / Huang Sui
 Zhao Tingting / Yu Yang
 Kumiko Ogura / Reiko Shiota
 Jiang Yanmei / Li Yujia
 Gail Emms / Donna Kellogg

Results

Mixed doubles

Seeds
 Nova Widianto / Lilyana Natsir
 Flandy Limpele / Vita Marissa
 Nathan Robertson / Gail Emms
 Xie Zhongbo / Zhang Yawen
 Thomas Laybourn / Kamilla Rytter Juhl
 Anthony Clark / Donna Kellogg
 He Hanbin / Yu Yang
 Xu Chen / Zhao Tingting

Results

References
 Denmark Open – Gade to face Lin Dan in quarters, Badzine.net, Retrieved 19 May 2017

External links
 Tournamentsoftware.com: Denmark Super Series 2007

Denmark Open
D
Denmark